Chrysosomatini is a tribe of flies in the family Dolichopodidae.

Genera
Abbemyia Bickel, 1994
Amblypsilopus Bigot, 1889
Austrosciapus Bickel, 1994
Bickeliolus Grichanov, 1996
Chrysosoma Guérin-Méneville, 1831
Ethiosciapus Bickel, 1994
Gigantosciapus Grichanov, 1997
Heteropsilopus Bigot, 1859
Krakatauia Enderlein, 1912
Lapita Bickel, 2002
Parentia Hardy, 1935
Plagiozopelma Enderlein, 1912
Pseudoparentia Bickel, 1994

References 

Sciapodinae
Diptera tribes